VTB may refer to:
VTB Bank, a Russian universal bank
VTB United League, a basketball league
VTB Arena, a planned stadium in Moscow
VTB Ice Palace, Moscow
VTB Capital, a branch of VTB Group
VTB, IATA code of Vitebsk Vostochny Airport, Belarus
Vermont Teddy Bear Company
 VTB - Torpedo bomber Squadron, US Navy acronym